Merope (Ancient Greek: Μερόπη Meropê) was a mortal princess in Greek mythology, who was raped by hunter Orion and was his fiancée. She is called Haero by Parthenius of Nicaea.

Family 
Merope was a daughter of King Oenopion, who was a legendary ruler of Chios and son of Princess Ariadne. He was said to have brought winemaking to the island. Merope's mother was the nymph Helike. She was a sister to Melas, Talus, Euanthes, Salagus and Athamas.

Merope and Orion 
The story of Oenopion's daughter differs somewhat in different ancient sources. The hunter Orion married a lovely woman called Side and when she was punished by Hera, he walked to Chios over the Aegean, and Oenopion welcomed him with a banquet.

Merope was beloved by Orion but he did not have the approval of Oenopion. Orion got drunk and assaulted Merope. In revenge, Oenopion stabbed out Orion's eyes, and then threw him off the island.

Theories 

The story of Orion and Merope varies. One source refers to Merope as the wife of Oenopion and not his daughter. Another refers to Merope as the daughter of King Minos, who was a father of Merope's grandmother.

The Hungarian mythographer Károly Kerényi, one of the founders of the modern study of mythology, wrote about Merope in Gods of the Greeks. Kerényi portrays Orion as a giant born outside his mother. He placed great stress on the variant in which Merope is the wife of Oenopion. He sees this as the remnant of a lost form of the myth in which Merope was Orion's mother (converted by later generations to his stepmother).

In popular culture 
The 2002 opera Galileo Galilei by American composer Philip Glass includes an opera within an opera piece between Orion and Merope.

Asteroid 1051 Merope is named for her.

Notes

References 

 Parthenius, Love Romances translated by Sir Stephen Gaselee (1882-1943), S. Loeb Classical Library Volume 69. Cambridge, MA. Harvard University Press. 1916.  Online version at the Topos Text Project.
 Parthenius, Erotici Scriptores Graeci, Vol. 1. Rudolf Hercher. in aedibus B. G. Teubneri. Leipzig. 1858. Greek text available at the Perseus Digital Library.
 Pausanias, Description of Greece with an English Translation by W.H.S. Jones, Litt.D., and H.A. Ormerod, M.A., in 4 Volumes. Cambridge, MA, Harvard University Press; London, William Heinemann Ltd. 1918. . Online version at the Perseus Digital Library
 Pausanias, Graeciae Descriptio. 3 vols. Leipzig, Teubner. 1903.  Greek text available at the Perseus Digital Library.

Greek princesses
Women in Greek mythology
Characters in Greek mythology